The STV rifle, short for Súng Trường Việt Nam or Súng Tiểu liên Việt Nam, is a family of Vietnamese assault rifles. They are products of the Z111 Factory and are chambered in 7.62x39mm.

As of 2021, the STV-215 and the STV-380 are the standard issued rifles for the People's Army of Vietnam. The STV-022 is reported to be pressed into service.

History 
In 2014, the People's Army of Vietnam adopted the IWI Galil ACE 31/32 as the standard issue rifle. This included a license to manufacture them locally at the Z111 Factory. The factory immediately began modifying the IWI Galil ACE to better suit the local terrain and climate, while also implementing more Kalashnikov parts. This was done to improve familiarity and smoothen the transition from older AK-47 and AKM assault rifles, which were used by Vietnamese soldiers. 

The modification process was a fusion of the STL-1A and the Galil ACE, this resulted in a prototype rifle named the GK1 and the GK3. 

In 2019, the Z111 Factory revealed two new rifles. Designated the STV-215 and the STV-380, the number at the end would indicate the length of the barrels. These two new rifles would be replacing the IWI Galil ACE 31/32 as the standard issued rifle for the People's Army of Vietnam.

In 2020, two new variants of the STV rifles were revealed. These rifles were designated as the STV-410 and the STV-416. Compared to the previous two variants, the new ones would adopt more AK parts into the guns. Currently, the STV-215 and STV-380 remain as the standard issued rifles and being the only ones which are in mass production.

The STV-380 was seen in 2021 in parades for the first time alongside the K20 camo uniforms.

In December 2022, a new variant designated as STV-022 was revealed at the 2022 Vietnam Defence Expo. It is a further shortened variant of the standard-issued STV-215, having its stock removed compared to the bigger variants. It was also spotted being used by VPA personnel in the same event. It is also spotted with the Vietnam Border Guard.

Design 
All STV variants are generally similar and are mainly built off of the IWI Galil ACE's milled receiver. They are all chambered in 7.62x39mm and can use any standard AK-47/AKM magazines.

The rifles all have the charging handle located on the right side, which is the same for all IWI Galil ACEs manufactured in Vietnam. However, the selective-fire mechanism uses a traditional AK-based mechanism. The handguards and pistol grips are made of polymer and all of the rifles have a folding stock. A bird-cage muzzle brake is included on all rifles.

As the handguards and receiver include a Picatinny rail on top, attachments can be mounted on such as telescopic sights, red dot sights, or holographic sights. The rear sight is located at the rear of the gun. The only exception to this is the STV-416, which does not include any Picatinny rails. 

The STV-215 and STV-380 have an additional Picatinny rail located on the bottom of the handguard, commonly used for a foregrip/bipod, laser, or flashlight attachment. When nothing is attached, a plastic cover can be placed over the Picatinny rail for more comfort while holding. The pistol grip for these two are built in to the body of the rifle. These two variants also share the front-sight and gas block similar to the ones found on the IWI Galil ACE. 

The STV-410 and STV-416 both lack a Picatinny rail on the bottom of the handguard. Instead, they include a mount for an underbarrel grenade launcher. They also have a slightly different magazine well and trigger rim. The pistol grip for these two variants are also independent of the body and are also based on the AK. These two variants use a folding polymer AK stock instead of the FN FAL styled stocks used by the STV-215 and STV-380. The front-sight and gas block on these two variants are different from each other.

It was reported in 2021 that the OPL-40M underbarrel grenade launcher would be used in conjunction with the STVs.

The smallest variant STV-022 largely resembles the STV-215 but having its stocks removed, further shortening the overall size of the rifle.

Variants 
Note that all variants are designated corresponding to their barrel lengths (except for STV-022).

STV-215 
The STV-215 is the carbine version of the STV-380. It is used alongside the STV-380 as one of the standard issued rifles for the People's Army of Vietnam. It is similar to the STV-380 in all aspects, except the barrel length.

STV-022 
Unlike other STV variants, the "022" designation likely refers the variant's year of introduction of 2022 instead of its actual barrel length. 

Not much information was revealed about this rifle but according to the publicized picture, it is the smallest variant of the STV family with the whole rifle largely resembles the STV-215, except with the stock eventually removed to further downsizing the rifle. 

Despite its compact size, it is still chambered in 7.62×39mm.

It is likely the next STV variant to be issued to the People's Army of Vietnam, especially for the Vietnam Border Guard.

STV-380 
The STV-380 is one of the standard issued assault rifles for the People's Army of Vietnam. It has a foldable stock similar to the FN FAL PARA.

STV-410 
The build of the STV-410 overall resembles an AK-15. The handguard's Picatinny rail is slightly extended to cover the entirety of the handguard.

STV-416 
The STV-416 is an assault rifle, which resembles an AK-103. The rifle is the only variant that does not include any Picatinny rails. Instead, it includes a side-mount for sights and a mount on the handguard for a grenade launcher. 

The rear-sight is moved up to the rear of the handguard. The front-sight and gas block are similar to the ones found AK-103.

References 

Kalashnikov derivatives
7.62×39mm assault rifles
Weapons of Vietnam
Weapons and ammunition introduced in 2019